Phyllodesmium colemani is a species of sea slug, an aeolid nudibranch, a marine gastropod mollusc in the family Facelinidae.

Distribution 
This species was described from Lord Howe Island, Australia where it was discovered by Neville Coleman. It is also known from the Philippines and the area of the central Indo-Pacific Ocean.

Description 
Phyllodesmium colemani uses camouflage and hides amongst the polyps of Tubipora musica on which it feeds. The length of the slug is 18 mm. This species contains zooxanthellae which are stored in aggregations of terminal chambers all over the ceratal wall.

Ecology 
Phyllodesmium colemani feeds on Organ pipe coral Tubipora musica usually in very shallow water, typically 2–5 m depth.

References

Facelinidae
Gastropods described in 1991